Bishnu (Nepali: विष्णु) is a rural municipality in Sarlahi District, a part of Province No. 2 in Nepal. It was formed in 2016 occupying current 8 sections (wards) from previous 4 former VDCs including Simara, Bara Udhoran, Madhubangoth and Batraul. It occupies an area of 28.09 km2 with a total population of 24,748.

References 

Populated places in Sarlahi District
Rural municipalities of Nepal established in 2017
Rural municipalities in Madhesh Province